Mary Denisse Munive Angermüller (born 10 April 1981) is a Costa Rican physician and politician who is the Second Vice President of Costa Rica. She assumed office on 8 May 2022.

References 

1981 births
Living people
Costa Rican politicians
Vice presidents of Costa Rica
Women vice presidents